Lazaros Loizidis (born 16 December 1976 in Taldykorgan) is a Greek former wrestler who competed in the 1996 Summer Olympics and in the 2004 Summer Olympics. He competed in the 74–85 kg category. Bronze medalist of the European Championships in 2004 and 2005. Silver medalist of the Mediterranean in 1997, 2001 and 2005. The third in the Junior World Cup in 1994. Also he is the brother Nikolaos Loizidis wrestler and Olympian from Sydney 2000.

References

External links
 

1976 births
Living people
Pontic Greeks
People from Taldykorgan
Kazakhstani people of Greek descent
Soviet people of Greek descent
Kazakhstani emigrants to Greece
Olympic wrestlers of Greece
Wrestlers at the 1996 Summer Olympics
Greek male sport wrestlers
Wrestlers at the 2004 Summer Olympics
Mediterranean Games silver medalists for Greece
Mediterranean Games medalists in wrestling
Competitors at the 2001 Mediterranean Games